This article presents a list of the historical events and publications of Australian literature during 1961.

Events
The Australian Book Review was founded in 1961 by Max Harris and Rosemary Wighton.

Major publications

Books 

 James Aldridge – The Last Exile
 Mena Calthorpe – The Dyehouse
 A. Bertram Chandler – The Rim of Space
 Kenneth Cook – Wake in Fright
 Dymphna Cusack – Heatwave in Berlin
 Nene Gare – The Fringe Dwellers
 Xavier Herbert – Soldiers' Women
 Elizabeth Kata – Be Ready with Bells and Drums
 John O'Grady – No Kava for Johnny
 Ruth Park – The Good Looking Women (aka Serpent's Delight)
 Hal Porter – The Tilted Cross
 George Turner – A Stranger and Afraid
 Judah Waten – Time of Conflict
 Morris West – Daughter of Silence
 Patrick White – Riders in the Chariot

Short stories 

 Thea Astley – "Cubby"
 A. Bertram Chandler – "All Laced Up"
 Shirley Hazzard – "Woollahra Road"
 Ray Mathew – A Bohemian Affair : Short Stories
 D'Arcy Niland
 The Ballad of the Fat Bushranger : and other stories
 Dadda Jumped Over Two Elephants
 Logan's Girl and Other Stories
 Desmond O'Grady – "Barbecue"
 Charles Osborne – Australian Stories of Today
 Hal Porter – "Say to Me Roland!"

Children's and Young Adult fiction 

 L. H. Evers – The Racketty Street Gang
 John Gunn – Dangerous Enemies
 Ruth Park – The Hole in the Hill
 Betty Roland – Forbidden Bridge
 Colin Thiele – Sun on the Stubble
 Joan Woodberry – Rafferty Rides a Winner

Poetry 

 Vincent Buckley – Masters in Israel
 Emily Bulcock – From Australia to Britain
 Gwen Harwood
 "In the Park"
 "Nightfall"
 A. D. Hope – "The Double Looking Glass"
 David Malouf – "At My Grandmother's"
 Peter Porter – Once Bitten, Twice Bitten
 Elizabeth Riddell – Forbears
 Thomas Shapcott – Time on Fire
 Randolph Stow
 "Dust"
 "Ruins of the City of Hay"
 Chris Wallace-Crabbe – "Melbourne"
 Francis Webb – Socrates and Other Poems

Biography 

 Frank Hardy – The Hard Way : The Story Behind Power Without Glory

Drama 

 Russell Braddon – The Naked Island
 Ray Lawler – The Piccadilly Bushman

Awards and honours

Literary

Children and Young Adult

Poetry

Births 

A list, ordered by date of birth (and, if the date is either unspecified or repeated, ordered alphabetically by surname) of births in 1961 of Australian literary figures, authors of written works or literature-related individuals follows, including year of death.

 29 June — Peter FitzSimons, writer
 20 August – Greg Egan, novelist and short story writer
 3 September — Andy Griffiths, writer for children
 30 September — Jordie Albiston, poet and academic (died 2022)

Unknown date
 Richard Flanagan, novelist

Deaths 

A list, ordered by date of death (and, if the date is either unspecified or repeated, ordered alphabetically by surname) of deaths in 1961 of Australian literary figures, authors of written works or literature-related individuals follows, including year of birth.

 22 May — Lionel Lindsay, artist and essayist (born 1874)
 9 June – Jeannie Gunn, novelist (born 1870)
 27 June – Harry Hooton, poet and social commentator (born 1908)
 24 July – William Fleming, novelist and poet (born 1874)
 20 August — Alice Grant Rosman, novelist (born 1882)
 6 October – Mary Montgomerie Bennett, biographer and nonfiction author (born 1881)

See also 
 1961 in Australia
 1961 in literature
 1961 in poetry
 List of years in Australian literature
 List of years in literature

References

 
Australian literature by year
20th-century Australian literature
1961 in literature